Robert “Bobby” Grace (born September 29, 1960) is an American attorney. He is currently a Deputy District Attorney for the County of Los Angeles, working in the Major Crimes Unit. Grace has successfully prosecuted homicide cases, including those of Chester Turner and the Black Widow Killers.

Notable cases
•      People v. David Mahler (2008): Bobby successfully prosecuted New York lawyer, David Mahler, who shot his girlfriend, Krissy Baldwin, to death, then dumped her body in the desert near Barstow, California.  Bobby had to present secondary DNA evidence to connect Mahler to the crime because of the severely decomposed state in which Baldwin’s body was discovered.

•	People v. Helen Golay & Olga Rutterschmidt (2008): Bobby helped prosecute the “Black Widow Killers,” for the murders of two homeless men.  The women took out life insurance policies worth millions of dollars on both men, and then killed them to collect the premiums.  Bobby has been featured on several true crime television programs detailing this case.

•	People v. Chester Turner (2007): Bobby prosecuted serial killer Chester Turner for the murder of eleven women in south Los Angeles during the 1980s and early 1990s.  Turner holds the dubious record of being the most prolific serial killer in Los Angeles’ history.  Turner was ultimately sentenced to death for his crimes.

•	People v. Wayne Taylor (2007): Bobby convicted Wayne Taylor. Taylor murdered his father in Baldwin Hills, cut off his father’s extremities and attempted to burn the body parts.  Bobby was able to present intricate DNA evidence that tied Taylor to his father’s murder.

•	In 2002, The Association of Deputy District Attorneys (“ADDA”) awarded Bobby their “Pursuit of Justice Award” for obtaining murder convictions in the case of People v. Henry Hayes, a Los Angeles minister who murdered his wife and daughter.

•	In 1999, Bobby received the “Outstanding Community Service Award” for securing murder convictions against three Los Angeles gang members for the slaying of a high-school student, Corrie Williams, who was killed while riding a MTA bus home from school.

•	People v. Calvin Broadus (1996): As part of the Hardcore Gang Division, Bobby worked to prosecute Calvin Broadus (aka “Snoop Dogg”).  Bobby tried Broadus and his bodyguard for murder and remained steadfast despite being the target of death threats.  Bobby was featured in The Wall Street Journal for the “Trying Times” he endured prosecuting that case.

Community involvement
Bobby serves on the Board of Directors of the UCLA Black Alumni Association.

References 

Living people
1960 births
Lawyers from Los Angeles
Place of birth missing (living people)
University of California, Los Angeles alumni